Dick Taylor (born 1943), English musician, guitarist with The Pretty Things and early bass player for The Rolling Stones.

Dick Taylor may also refer to:

Dick Taylor (Australian rules footballer) (1901–1962), Australian football centerman
Dick Taylor (football manager) (1918–1995), English football defender for Grimsby Town and Scunthorpe United, later manager of Aston Villa F.C.
Dick Taylor (Iowa politician) (born 1931), Iowa State Representative
Dick Taylor (athlete) (born 1945), British long-distance runner
Dick Taylor (footballer, born 1957), English football goalkeeper for Huddersfield Town and York City

See also
Dick Tayler (born 1948), former New Zealand runner
Richard Taylor (disambiguation)
List of people with surname Taylor
Taylor (surname)